The 1966–67 DDR-Oberliga season was the 19th season of the DDR-Oberliga, the top level of ice hockey in East Germany. Eight teams participated in the league. SG Dynamo Weißwasser and SC Dynamo Berlin won the championship.

First round

Final round

Qualification round

References

External links
East German results 1949-1970

DDR-Oberliga (ice hockey) seasons
Ober
Ger
1966 in East German sport
1967 in East German sport